Jonathan Wright is a British journalist and literary translator.

Biography
Wright was born in Andover, Hampshire, and spent his childhood in Canada, Malaysia, Hong Kong and Germany. He attended Packwood Haugh School from 1966 to 1967 and Shrewsbury School from 1967 to 1971.
He studied Arabic, Turkish and Islamic civilisation at St John's College, Oxford. He joined Reuters news agency in 1980 as a correspondent, and has been based in the Middle East for most of the last three decades. He has served as Reuters' Cairo bureau chief, and he has lived and worked throughout the region, including in Egypt, Sudan, Lebanon, Tunisia and the Persian Gulf region. From 1997 to 2003, he was based in Washington, DC, covering US foreign policy for Reuters. For two years until the fall of 2011 Wright was editor of the Arab Media & Society Journal, published by the Kamal Adham Center for Journalism Training and Research at the American University in Cairo.

Translations

Kidnapping and Escape
On 29 August 1984, while on a reporting assignment for Reuters in the Bekaa Valley, Lebanon, Wright was detained and held hostage by the Palestinian splinter group led by Abu Nidal in a part of the Lebanon hostage crisis. The group wanted to exchange him for members imprisoned in Britain for shooting the Israeli ambassador, Shlomo Argov, in London in June 1982. Wright spent about one week in a small room in a country house near the town of Barr Elias and was then moved to a large villa near the Chouf mountain town of Bhamdoun, above Beirut. In the early hours of 16 September 1984, Wright escaped from captivity by removing the plank of wood covering a ventilation hole and crawling through the hole, which was about 10 feet above floor level. He reached the hole by dismantling his metal bedstead and using the frame as a ladder. Once outside, he walked along the Beirut-Damascus highway until he reached a checkpoint manned by the mainly Druze Muslim Progressive Socialist Party. The party militia held him incommunicado at Aley police station until 19 September, when party leader Walid Jumblatt told his aides to drive him to the Reuters office in Beirut.

See also
List of kidnappings
List of solved missing person cases

Awards and honours
2013 Banipal Prize for Arabic Literary Translation for the translation of Azazeel by Youssef Ziedan
2014 Independent Foreign Fiction Prize for the translation of The Iraqi Christ by Hassan Blassim
2016 Banipal Prize for Arabic Literary Translation for his translation of The Bamboo Stalk by Saud Alsanousi

References

1980s missing person cases
Alumni of St John's College, Oxford
Arabic–English translators
British escapees
British people taken hostage
English male journalists
English male non-fiction writers
Formerly missing people
Foreign hostages in Lebanon
Kidnapped British people
Kidnappings by Islamists
Living people
Missing person cases in Lebanon
People educated at Shrewsbury School
Year of birth missing (living people)